David Caligaris on 1956 is a retired  Greek American professional basketball player. He played college basketball with Northeastern University.

He was selected by the Detroit Pistons in the 5th round of the 1978 NBA Draft, 95th overall.

He played from 1978 to 1981 for Sporting in Greece. He is considered to be one of the greatest players in Sporting history. He was the third scorer for the Greek championship in the 1978–79 period scoring 649 points and the second scorer in 1979–80 period scoring 727 points.

External links 
Northeastern University Legends
Northeastern University Records
Northeastern University Hall of Fame
Yesterdays Hero Dave Caligaris

1956 births
Living people
American people of Greek descent
Detroit Pistons draft picks
Greek men's basketball players
Greek Basket League players
Northeastern Huskies men's basketball players
Sporting basketball players
American men's basketball players